Jacques Rousseau Award is an award given by the Association francophone pour le savoir (ACFAS) to an individual or group who develop bridges between scientific disciplines. The award is named for Jacques Rousseau who was both a botanist and an anthropologist. He was a former secretary of the ACFAS.

Laureates
 1981 : Louis Berlinguet
1982 : Gilles Paquet
1983 : Larkin Kerwin
1984 : Fernand Dumont
1985 : Gérard Bouchard
1986 : Fernand Roberge
1987 : Michael Florian
1988 : André Roch Lecours
1989 : Henri Dorion
1990 : Paul Brazeau
1991 : Jean-Charles Chebat
1992 : Ferdinand Bonn
1993 : Karen Messing
1994 : Régine Robin
1995 : Albert Bregman
1998 : Rodolphe De Koninck
1999 : Gilbert Laporte
2000 : Michel Laroche
2001 : Normand Séguin
2002 : Richard E Tremblay
2003 : Leon Glass
 2004 : No award
 2005 : No award
 2006 : No award
 2007 : Yves Gingras
 2008 : Pierre Hansen, researching mathematics and management, HEC Montréal
 2009 : Isabelle Peretz, researching neuroscience and music, Montreal University
 2010 : Louise Vandelac, researching sociology and environment
, Université du Québec à Montréal
 2011 : Bartha Knoppers, researching ethics and biotechnology, McGill University
 2012 : Mohamad Sawan, researching implants, École Polytechnique de Montréal 
 2013 : Yves De Koninck, researching neurosciences, Université Laval 
 2014 : Sylvain Martel, researching nanorobotics,  École Polytechnique de Montréal 
 2015 : Carl-Éric Aubin, researching genetic biomédical, École Polytechnique de Montréal
 2016 : André-Pierre Contandriopoulos

References

Canadian science and technology awards